Nancheng may refer to the following places in China:

Pinyin Romanization
Nancheng County (南城县), Fuzhou, Jiangxi
Nancheng District (南城区), Dongguan, Guangdong
Nancheng, Dehua County (南埕镇), in Dehua County, Fujian
Nancheng, Lianyungang (南城镇), town in Xinpu District, Lianyungang, Jiangsu
Nancheng, Xiajin County (南城镇), town in Xiajin County, Shandong
Subdistricts (南城街道)
Nancheng Subdistrict, Nanchuan District, in Nanchuan District, Chongqing
Nancheng Subdistrict, Tongliang County, in Tongliang County, Chongqing
Nancheng Subdistrict, Longyan, in Xinluo District, Longyan, Fujian
Nancheng Subdistrict, Yingcheng, in Yingcheng City, Xiaogan Hubei
Nancheng Subdistrict, Anlu, in Anlu City, Xiagoan, Hubei
Nancheng Subdistrict, Zaoyang, in Zaoyang City, Hubei
Nancheng Subdistrict, Shulan, in Shulan City, Jilin
Nancheng Subdistrict, Heze, in Mudan District, Heze, Shandong
Nancheng Subdistrict, Shan County, Shandong, in Shan County, Shandong
Nancheng Subdistrict, Shuozhou, in Shuocheng District, Shuozhou, Shanxi
Nancheng Subdistrict, Xinzhou, in Xinfu District, Xinzhou, Shanxi
Nancheng Subdistrict, Yuanping, in Yuanping City, Shanxi
Nancheng Subdistrict, Yuncheng, in Yanhu District, Yuncheng, Shanxi
Nancheng Subdistrict, Luzhou, in Jiangyang District, Luzhou, Sichuan
Nancheng Subdistrict, Yibin, in Cuiping District, Yibin, Sichuan
Nancheng Subdistrict, Aksu, Xinjiang, in Aksu, Xinjiang
Nancheng Subdistrict, Taizhou, Zhejiang, in Huangyan District, Taizhou, Zhejiang

Other Romanizations
Nanzheng County (南鄭), a county in and former name of Hanzhong, Shaanxi